Josh Perry (born 4 February 1981) is an Australian former professional rugby league footballer. An Australian international and New South Wales State of Origin representative , he played in the NRL for the Newcastle Knights, with whom he won the 2001 NRL Premiership and the Manly Warringah Sea Eagles, with whom he won the 2008 NRL Premiership, and played in the Super League for St Helens.

Background
Perry was born in Newcastle, New South Wales, Australia.

Perry attended Caves Beach Public School and his very first Rugby League Club was Swansea Junior Rugby League Club, NSW. He was a Valentine Junior.

His brother James plays for the Philadelphia Fight in the American National Rugby League.

Playing career

Club career

Newcastle Knights
Perry made his first-grade début in round 17 of the 2000 season playing for Newcastle against the New Zealand Warriors at EnergyAustralia Stadium on 27 May.

Perry played at prop forward in the 2001 NRL Grand Final-winning Newcastle team that defeated the Parramatta Eels, 30–24 at Stadium Australia on 30 September in an upset victory. Having won the 2001 NRL Premiership, the Newcastle club traveled to England to play the 2002 World Club Challenge against Super League champions, the Bradford Bulls. Perry played at prop forward in Newcastle's loss.

In the 2005 NRL season, Perry was limited to only seven appearances for Newcastle as the club endured a horror year on the field and finished last.  In the 2006 NRL season, the club turned their fortunes around by qualifying for the finals.  Perry played in the club's 50-6 elimination final loss against the Brisbane Broncos at the Sydney Football Stadium.

Manly-Warringah Sea Eagles
In 2007, Perry came off contract at the Newcastle Knights and he signed for the Manly-Warringah Sea Eagles for the 2008 NRL season on a three-year contract.

In his first year with the Sea Eagles, Perry played in the 2008 NRL Grand Final victory over the Melbourne Storm.

St Helens
Perry joined English club St Helens for the 2011 season on a three-year contract. Perry saw out his contract and retired from the sport after being released at the end of the 2013 season.

Representative career
Perry was also selected for Country Origin in 2001, 2003 and 2004, scoring one try in the 2001 match.

Perry was selected to represent New South Wales as a reserve for game I of the 2003 State of Origin series.

In August 2008, Perry was named in the preliminary 46-man Kangaroos squad for the 2008 Rugby League World Cup.

Two days following the 2008 NRL grand final, Perry was named in the 24-man Australia squad for the 2008 Rugby League World Cup. Perry made his test début for Australia against New Zealand from the bench in Australia's opening RLWC 08 game on 26 October.

He was selected for Country in the City vs Country match on 8 May 2009 and selected in the New South Wales team for game 3 in the 2009 series.

Perry was rewarded for his and Manly's good start to 2010 NRL season with selection on the bench for Australia in the 2010 ANZAC Test against New Zealand in Melbourne on 7 May.

References

Footnotes

External links

Manly Sea Eagles profile
Saints Heritage Society profile

1981 births
Living people
Australia national rugby league team players
Australian rugby league players
Country New South Wales Origin rugby league team players
Manly Warringah Sea Eagles players
New South Wales Rugby League State of Origin players
Newcastle Knights players
Rugby league players from Newcastle, New South Wales
Rugby league props
St Helens R.F.C. players
Valentine-Eleebana Red Devils players
Western Suburbs Rosellas players